Independent Alliance may refer to:

Independent Alliance (Ireland), a political grouping in the Republic of Ireland
Independent Alliance of Mozambique, a political party in Mozambique
Independent Alliance of Latin America and the Caribbean, a grouping of countries that cooperate on certain issues as a block in international climate negotiations
Independent Alliance Party, a former political party in the Canadian territory of Yukon
Independent Alliance for Reform, a political grouping in the British nation of Wales